DemocracyInAction, or DIA, was a Washington, D.C.-based 501(c)(3) public charity organization focused on being a nonprofit technology provider.

DemocracyInAction was the creator and primary maintainer of an open source software application. The original version is referred to as Tomato but was not named until after the release of the current version. This release is named Salsa. It is written in Java.  Incorporated as a 501(c)(3), DemocracyInAction also operates as an application service provider hosting a suite of electronic advocacy tools for other nonprofits. Over 300 organizations use the DemocracyInAction / Salsa toolset.

References

External links
 Official Site

Charities based in Washington, D.C.
Internet-related activism
Internet-based activism
Organizations established in 2005